The Phi Beta Delta Society is an international honor society that was founded at California State University, Long Beach on February 27, 1986. It was the first honor society dedicated to recognize scholarly achievement in international involvement and education, to give scholarships to deserving students and to enhance knowledge about various cultures around the world. It was established as a national organization in 1987 with 38 chartered chapters, and has grown to become an international organization with over 179 chapters.

The motto of the society is "Scientia Mutua Mundi" (World's Shared Knowledge). Phi Beta Delta (ΦΒΔ) stands for philomatheia, biotremmonia, diapheren — "Love of knowledge, valuing of human life; and achieving excellence".

Membership
Membership in the Society is open to individuals who have demonstrated scholarly achievement through international involvement. These individuals include:
 international students (non-immigrant visa holders in the upper division or graduate levels) who have demonstrated high scholastic achievement at their institution;
 domestic students (upper division and graduate level) who have demonstrated high scholastic achievement in the pursuit of academic studies abroad in exchange programs approved by the institution or in participation in comparable international programs or experiences where academic relevance can be demonstrated to the institution;
 distinguished faculty and staff who have been involved in recognized international endeavors (i.e. research, teaching, program development, or service).

Phi Beta Delta Executive Office

Phi Beta Delta Honor Society's headquarters are at California State University, San Bernardino. The contact information for headquarters is: Phi Beta Delta Headquarters, AD 148 & 150, California State University, San Bernardino. 5500 University Parkway, San Bernardino, CA 92407. The Executive Director is Dr. Amy Leh.

Headquarters was previously located at 1527 New Hampshire Avenue in the Dupont Circle area of Washington DC. At this address, the offices of Phi Beta Delta and Policy Studies Organization were located. This site was the home of the son of James A. Garfield, the twentieth President of the United States. Dr. Harry Garfield was the President of Williams College from 1908 to 1934 and a member of President Woodrow Wilsons Kitchen cabinet. The house continues to be a center for international focus. It was rented out in 1920 to Carter Glass who became Secretary of the Treasury under Wilson, and then Senator from Virginia, and who is regarded as a founder of the Federal Reserve System. Garfield also rented the house to the Ecuador Embassy and later to the British Embassy's air attache.

Chapters

The organization has chapters in over 179 campuses worldwide. International chapters are in Bulgaria, Canada, Mexico, Switzerland, and the United States of America.

Publications
 The Medallion (the Society newsletter)
 Proceedings (a record of ideas, issues, and topics of interest to the Society)
 International Research and Review (the peer reviewed journal of the Society)
 52 Weekly Thoughts

Notable and Honorary Members

 Dr. Carole Artigiani, U.S
 Ba Amadou, Ambassador, Embassy of Senegal (Senegal)
 Horace G. Dawson, U.S Ambassador (U.S.)
 Saskia Eijssen, SU / International Student & Scholar Services (The Netherlands)
 Ahmad El Shiref, Central Missouri State University / Peace Studies, (U.S.)
 Leonel Fernández, President Dominican Republic, (Dominican Republic)
 Margarita Cedeño de Fernández, First Lady Dominican Republic, (Dominican Republic)
 Oliver Franklin St. Clair, President International House, (U.S)
 Harriet Mayor Fulbright, former Executive Director of the President's Committee on the Arts and Humanities and President of the J. William and Harriet Fulbright Center.
 J. William Fulbright, U.S Senator and founder of international exchange program, Fulbright Program (U.S.)
 Mahamoud Adam Béchir, Ambassador Embassy of Chad (Chad)
 Colin Powell, Secretary of State under George W. Bush
 Thomas F O'Neill, Cultural Diversity Instructor, Suzhou International Foreign Language School, Suzhou, China.
Michael R. Turner, Culture and Sports Attache, United States Embassy, Tokyo, Japan.

International Presidents
25th Anniversary Issue of the Medallion 

 Dr. Ann Marie Legreid, 2019-2020
 Mrs. Winnie Brophy, 2018-2019 
 Dr. Christina Sanchez, 2017-2018
 Dr. Rajrani Kalra, 2016-2017
 Dr. Astrid Sheil, 2015-2016
 Dr. Guillermo De Los Reyes, 2014-2015 
 Dr. Paul Amaya, 2013-2014
 Dr. Joy Stevenson, 2012-2013
 Dr. Richard Deming, 2011-2012
 Dr. Edward K. Khiwa, 2010–2011
 Dr. Judy Smhra, 2009–2010
 Dr. Monica Freeman, 2008–2009
 Dr. Eugene Eggers,2007- 2008
 Dr. Gene Eggar, 2006–2007
 Dr. Michael Smithee, 2005 - 2006
 Dr. India Dennis, 2004 - 2005
 Dr. Paul J. Rich, 2003 - 2004
 Dr. David E. R. Gay, 2002 - 2003
 Dr. James Fletcher, 2001 - 2002
 Dr. Jack Merchant, 2000–2001
 Dr. Art King, 1999 - 2000
 Dr. Barbara Hartung, 1998 - 1999
 Dr. Yvonne Captain, 1997–1998
 Dr. Earl Ellington, 1996–1997
 Dr. Thomas Knutson, 1995 - 1996
 Dr. Paul Parrish, 1994–1995
 Dr. Mark "Gene" Meadows, 1993–1994
 Dr. Karen Boatman, 1992 - 1993
 Dr. Gregory Trzebiatowski, 1991 - 1992
 Dr. Judy Reinhartz, 1990 - 1991
 Dr. Gary Cretser, 1989 - 1990
 Dr. John Greisberger, 1988 - 1989
 Dr. Richard Downie, 1987 - 1988

Board members
The Board members are as follows:

References

External links
 Official website
  ACHS Phi Beta Delta entry

1986 establishments in California
Association of College Honor Societies
California State University, Long Beach
Dupont Circle
Organizations based in Washington, D.C.
Student organizations established in 1986